NGC 151 is a mid-sized barred spiral galaxy located in the constellation Cetus.

The galaxy was discovered by English astronomer William Herschel on November 28, 1785. In 1886, Lewis Swift observed the same galaxy and catalogued it as NGC 153, only for it later to be identified as NGC 151.

The galaxy, viewed from almost face on, has several bright, blue, dusty spiral arms filled with active star formation. One noticeable feature of the galaxy is a large gap between the spiral arms.

On July 22, 2011, a supernova was discovered within NGC 151 and designated PTF11iqb.

References

External links
 
 

0151
NGC 0151
NGC 0151
002035
Astronomical objects discovered in 1785